DJS may refer to:
 Department of Juvenile Services, a state agency of Maryland
 Director of the Joint Staff, a position in the United States Department of Defense
 D'Jais, D'Jais (pronounced DJ's) Bar & Grill is a popular dance club and restaurant in Belmar, New Jersey, USA
 Doctor of Juridical Science, a research doctorate in law
 Dubai Japanese School

DJs may refer to:
 DJs, plural of disc jockeys
 David Jones Limited, an Australian department store chain